Mahaut of Châtillon (1293– 3 October 1358) was the daughter of Guy IV of Châtillon, Count of Saint-Pol and Marie of Brittany, daughter of John II, Duke of Brittany.

Marriage 
In 1308 she married Charles, Count of Valois, the third son of King Phillip III of France and Isabella of Aragon. He was also the younger brother of King Philip IV. Charles himself had married twice before; upon the death of his second wife Catherine of Courtenay in 1308, he married Mahaut. Mahaut and Charles had four children. One of their daughters would make them ancestors of French kings, and another daughter would become Queen of Germany.

Mahaut and Charles's children were:

 Marie (1309–1332). Married Charles, Duke of Calabria and had issue.
 Isabella (1313 – 26 August 1388). She married Peter I, Duke of Bourbon. Had issue
 Blanche (1317–1348). She married Charles IV, King of Germany and Bohemia (after her death, he became Holy Roman Emperor). Sometimes called "Marguerite". Had issue
 Louis, Count of Chartres (1318–1328). Died young, no issue

Her husband Charles died in 1325. Mahaut died 33 years later in 1358 at the age of 65, having outlived three of her four children; only her second daughter Isabella outlived her.

Ancestors

References

Sources

1293 births
1358 deaths
13th-century French people
13th-century French women
14th-century French people
14th-century French women
Countesses of Chartres